Martín Cuevas Urroz (born January 14, 1992, in Salto, Uruguay) is a Uruguayan professional tennis player. Martín Cuevas is the brother of the Uruguayan player Pablo Cuevas. They have played together in the ATP Challenger Tour, winning the Copa Petrobras in Montevideo twice and Lyon once. Martín made his debut in Davis Cup against Dominican Republic, losing to Jhonson García. In total, he has a W/L record in Davis Cup of 15–19. Cuevas won 11 ITF Future singles titles and 12 ITF doubles titles.

Challenger and Futures/World Tennis Tour Finals

Singles: 23 (11–12)

Doubles: 41 (16–24)

Notes

References

External links
 
 
 

Uruguayan male tennis players
1992 births
Living people
Sportspeople from Salto, Uruguay
Tennis players at the 2011 Pan American Games
Pan American Games competitors for Uruguay
Competitors at the 2010 South American Games
20th-century Uruguayan people
21st-century Uruguayan people